Diggajaru is a 2001 Indian Kannada-language film directed by D. Rajendra Babu. The film stars Vishnuvardhan and Ambareesh. The music of the film was composed by Hamsalekha. It is a remake of the 1998 Tamil film Natpukkaga.

Plot 

A rich landlord and his servant bond well irrespective of their status. When the landlord accidentally commits a murder, the servant decides to take the blame on himself.

Cast 

 Vishnuvardhan as Chikkayya(son)/Mutthaya(father) (Double Role)
 Ambareesh as Wodeya
 Sanghavi as Parvati/Chikkammavru
 Tara as Gouraa
 Umashree as Muttayya's Mother
 Lakshmi as Ambareesh's wife/Ammavru
 Tennis Krishna as Amavaase
 Mansoor Ali Khan
 Doddanna
 Sundar Raj as Lekkachaara
 Lakshmi
 Gurudutt
 Reshma(Tara's daughter )

Soundtrack 
The soundtrack was composed by Hamsalekha.

References

External links 
 

2000s Kannada-language films
2001 films
Films directed by D. Rajendra Babu
Films scored by Hamsalekha
Kannada remakes of Tamil films